was a town located in Ōchi District, Shimane Prefecture, Japan.

As of 2003, the town had an estimated population of 5,180 and a density of 24.92 persons per km2. The total area was 207.83 km2.

On October 1, 2004, Mizuho, along with the town of Iwami, and the village of Hasumi (all from Ōchi District), was merged to create the town of Ōnan.

Dissolved municipalities of Shimane Prefecture